Alison Riske was the defending champion, but lost in the first round to Andrea Hlaváčková.

Anne Keothavong won the title defeating Marta Domachowska in the final 6–1, 6–3.

Seeds

Main draw

Finals

Top half

Bottom half

References
 Main Draw
 Qualifying Draw

Aegon GB Pro-Series Barnstaple - Singles